Scott Allen Shaver (born September 4, 1958) is a fine art photographer, a manager and a civil engineer.

Personal life 

Scott was born 4 September 1958. 
His hometown is Sylmar, California (near Los Angeles) 
. 
Most of Scott's early education was in Sylmar public schools. He attended Sylmar High School from 1972 to 1975. He accompanied his parents when they moved in 1975 to Visalia, in California's San Joaquin Valley. Scott graduated from Mt. Whitney High School in 1976. He married Sonya, raised Katherine (b. 1990) and Alexandra (b. 1992), and is now divorced.

Fine Art Photographer 

Scott's initial interest in photography was encouraged in large part by his father, who was a construction engineer and an accomplished photographer who was passionate about the craft. An early inspiration came from a book by Yousuf Karsh that turned Scott's attention to photographic style and lighting. Scott's formal training began in 10th grade at Sylmar High School, where Jack White was the photography teacher. A week-long workshop in 1995 with John Sexton, Ansel Adams' assistant, further inflamed Scott's passion for photography. Scott also studied Lucien Clergue's techniques of photographing nudes, and in 1977, he and Lucien Clergue conducted a workshop in Death Valley, California. As opportunity became available, Scott enrolled in photography classes at the community college and university.

Scott has worked in various fields of photography since graduating from high school in 1976. In addition to fine art photography, he has provided photography services to insurance, construction, architectural and law firms. He has photographed numerous weddings and has put together portfolios for many models. In the course of his photographic career, Scott has developed and taught numerous workshops.

Three major exhibitions demonstrate a major theme in Scott's work as a fine art portrait photographer. In Fresno Portraits, Scott identified more than fifty citizens of Fresno, California, who were recognized as contributing to the future of the area. The exhibition included twenty-seven portraits. This was Scott's first major exhibition in a museum.
The celebrity from this effort led to Faces of Hanford. Scott, with help from Hanford, California area civic and business leaders, selected people who typified the spirit of Hanford, California. This exhibition included forty portraits. Portraits of Tulare followed these two portrait exhibits. This exhibition included thirty-eight portraits of Tulare, California residents noted for their community contributions.
Other themes in Scott's work include landscapes, figure work, fashion, and details of found objects. Scott produces much of his work in large format black and white images, and in medium format color and black and white images. Throughout his work, Scott aims for simplicity and boldness of image, purity of technical means, and brightness of colors when they are used

Graphic Artist 

Scott's artistic desires and aspirations include the graphic arts of painting, sketching, printmaking, and silk-screening. Scott took up painting in earnest in 2003, and in 2004, he and his daughters produced their family exhibition, Familial Strokes. Scott has enrolled in a variety of fine arts classes at the community college level and has plans for completing a master's degree in Fine Arts.

Major Shows 

By 2003, Scott had participated in more than 130 Exhibitions. One of his photographs, Tree and Sunset, was accepted as a mural on State Route 99 in Fresno.

Manager

Schooling 

1992 Master of Business Administration with Distinction, Fresno State University, Fresno, CA

Major Projects 

Started working for Caltrans as a Supervising Transportation Engineer in 1990.

Civil Engineer

Schooling 

1983 BS Civil Engineering, Fresno State University, Fresno, CA

1986 MS Civil Engineering, Fresno State University, Fresno, CA

Major Projects 

Started working for Caltrans as a Transportation Engineer (Civil) in 1984

Works Cited

External links 

1958 births
Living people
American civil engineers
Artists from California
California State University, Fresno alumni
Photographers from California
Fine art photographers
People from Sylmar, Los Angeles
Engineers from California